The Air-to-Air Stinger (ATAS) (also unofficially called AIM-92 Stinger) is an air-to-air missile system developed from the shoulder-launched FIM-92 Stinger, for use on helicopters such as the AH-64 Apache, T129 ATAK, Eurocopter Tiger, and also UAVs such as the MQ-1 Predator. The missile itself is identical to the shoulder-launched Stinger.

Development
The US Army has used the ATAS variant on its OH-58D Kiowa Warrior and UH-60 Black Hawk helicopters in the air-to-air role.

All Air-to-Air Stinger (ATAS) Block II missiles will be modified existing Stinger RMP missiles (FIM-92C). Block II will incorporate various improvements including a new staring IR focal plane array seeker, a new battery, and advanced signal processing capabilities. The seeker permits engagements of helicopters in clutter out to the  maximum physical range of the missile, also improved accuracy and IRCCM capabilities, and will provide a full night capability. The Block II missile also supports seeker slaving (steering the missile's seeker off-axis before launch to lock onto targets). This was first demonstrated on 6 November 1997 at Yuma.

ATAL is an upgrade to the Air-to-Air Stinger launcher fielded on the OH-58D Kiowa Warrior and Blackhawk helicopters. In mid 2000, tests were carried out with the ATAL system mounted on the AH-64 Apache Longbow helicopter. Nine missiles were fired, eight of which scored direct hits against simulated hovering helicopter targets in a clutter environment.

Operational history
An Iraqi MiG-25 shot down a Predator drone performing reconnaissance over the no fly zone in Iraq on 23 December 2002. Predators had been armed with Stingers, and were being used to "bait" Iraqi fighter planes, then run. The Stinger failed to hit the MIG, possibly because it could not distinguish between the heat signatures of the MIG and the missile it fired. The missile fired by the MiG destroyed the Predator. This was the first time in history a conventional aircraft and a drone had engaged in combat.

Models
There are three variants of Air-to-Air Stinger (ATAS):

ATAS 
The original Air-to Air Stinger (ATAS) is an adaptation of the early versions man portable Stinger System including FIM-92B and C. It is a light weight missile designed to engage low altitude targets.

ATAS Block I
The ATAS Block I is an upgrade to the sensors and software to upgrade the ATAS to FIM-92E standard.

ATAS Block II
All Air-to-Air Stinger (ATAS) Block II missiles will be modified existing Stinger RMP missiles. The Block II retrofit program will add the Block I modifications plus incorporate a staring IR focal plane array seeker, a new battery, and advanced signal processing capabilities. The new seeker will permit engagements of helicopters in clutter out to the kinematic range of the missile. The missile and launcher will be MIL-STD-1760 compatible. The Block II program will also extend shelf life, improve accuracy and IRCCM capabilities, and will provide a full night capability.

General characteristics
As FIM-92 Stinger
 Length: 
 Diameter: 
 Wingspan: 
 Launch weight: 
 Guidance: Fire-and-forget passive infrared seeker for Block I and Fire-and-forget passive IR focal plane array seeker in Block II version 
 Warhead:  HE blast fragmentation
 Propulsion: Dual thrust solid fuel rocket motor
 Speed: Mach 2.2
 Range:

References

AIM-092
Military equipment introduced in the 1980s